Appalachian Bible College is a private Christian Bible college in Mount Hope, West Virginia. While unaffiliated with any particular denomination, it generally serves independent churches within the fundamental Bible and Baptist associations.

History
The school was founded as Appalachian Bible Institute in 1950 by Dr. Lester E. Pipkin and Rev. Robert S. Guelich. Pipkin served as the school's first President until he was replaced by Daniel L. Anderson, current president, in 1983.

Academics
All students who enroll in ABC's dual-major Bachelor of Arts program have one major in Bible and Theology and choose another ministry-related major. Additional programs include a Bible Certificate and an Associate of Arts. The school also offers online courses through ABC Connect, and on-campus modular classes for its Master of Arts in Ministry degree.

In 2014, ABC began offering accredited courses to inmates at Mount Olive Correctional Complex, West Virginia's maximum security prison. Mount Olive Bible College students are enrolled in the Pastoral ministry major. The first graduating class received Bachelor of Arts degrees in December 2018.

Accreditation
ABC is accredited by both the Higher Learning Commission and the Association for Biblical Higher Education.

References

External links
Official website

Seminaries and theological colleges in West Virginia
Association for Biblical Higher Education
Bible colleges
Educational institutions established in 1950
Education in Raleigh County, West Virginia
1950 establishments in West Virginia